Collabium is a genus of flowering plants in the orchid family, Orchidaceae. Species of Collabium are typically terrestrial and grow under shade in forests. They are distributed in southeast Asia from the Himalayas in India, Burma to China, and to the island groups in Malaysia, the Philippines, the Solomon Islands, Vanuatu, New Caledonia, and Fiji.

Species
Species accepted by the Plants of the World Online as of February 2021:
Collabium acuticalcar 
Collabium bicameratum 
Collabium carinatum 
Collabium chapaense 
Collabium chinense 
Collabium chloranthum 
Collabium delavayi 
Collabium evrardii 
Collabium formosanum 
Collabium nebulosum 
Collabium ovalifolium 
Collabium pumilum 
Collabium simplex 
Collabium vesicatum 
Collabium yunnanense

See also
List of Orchidaceae genera

References

External links
 

Collabieae genera
Terrestrial orchids
Collabieae